Desmond Roberts (5 February 1894 – 11 January 1968) was a British stage and film actor who also played first-class cricket, 1913–1936, for Surrey. He was born in Hampstead, and died in Eastbourne.

Partial filmography

 A Woman in Pawn (1927) - David Courthill
 The City of Youth (1928)
 A Reckless Gamble (1928) - Dick Beresford
 Way for a Sailor (1930) - Canadian Queen Captain (uncredited)
 The Royal Bed (1931) - Major Blent
 The Squaw Man (1931) - Hardwick (uncredited)
 But the Flesh Is Weak (1932) - Findley
 Cavalcade (1933) - Ronnie James
 The King's Vacation (1933) - Dolan - Sergeant Footman (uncredited)
 Christopher Strong (1933) - Bryce Mercer
 Headline Shooter (1933) - Beauty Contest Judge (uncredited)
 Captured! (1933) - British Officer in the Trench (uncredited)
 Blind Adventure (1933) - Harvey (uncredited)
 Mandalay (1934) - Police Sergeant (uncredited)
 The House of Rothschild (1934) - Guest at Reception Hall
 Riptide (1934) - Hotel Manager (uncredited)
 Tarzan and His Mate (1934) - Henry Van Ness (uncredited)
 The Key (1934) - Regular (uncredited)
 Of Human Bondage (1934) - Dr. Jacobs
 Grand Canary (1934) - Purser
 The Count of Monte Cristo (1934) - Blacas (uncredited)
 The Girl from Missouri (1934) - Harris - Cousin's Butler (uncredited)
 Jane Eyre (1934) - Dr. John Rivers (uncredited)
 The Fountain (1934) - Willett
 House of Danger (1934) - Gordon - the Butler
 Menace (1934) - Underwood (uncredited)
 Limehouse Blues (1934) - Constable (uncredited)
 Clive of India (1935) - Third Director (uncredited)
 Gaol Break (1936) - Paul Kendall
 Under the Red Robe (1937) - Captain Rivarolle
 Lily of Laguna (1938) - Arnold Egerton
 My Ain Folk (1945) - Factory manager
 Give Me the Stars (1945) - Ship's Captain
 The Echo Murders (1945) - Cotter
 School for Secrets (1946) - 2nd Club Member
 Dusty Bates (1947) - Ginger Green (uncredited)
 The White Unicorn (1947) - Elderly Roue (uncredited)
 The Calendar (1948) - Rainby
 Scott of the Antarctic (1948) - Admiralty Official
 The Bad Lord Byron (1949) - 2nd Old club member
 The Man in the White Suit (1951) - Mannering
 Appointment in London (1953) - Admiral Parker (uncredited)
 Beau Brummell (1954) - Colonel
 Simba (1955) - Colonel Bridgeman
 The Haunted Strangler (1958) - Dr. Johnson
 I Was Monty's Double (1958) - Brigadier
 The Two-Headed Spy (1958) - Gen. Zeiss
 A Night to Remember (1958) - Mr. Douglas (uncredited)
 A Touch of Larceny (1960) - Club Member
 Double Bunk (1961) - Freighter Captain
 Murder Ahoy! (1964) - Sir Geoffrey Bucknose (uncredited)
 Mister Ten Per Cent (1967) - Manservant (final film role)

References

Bibliography
 Philip Leibfried & Chei Mi Lane. Anna May Wong: A Complete Guide to Her Film, Stage, Radio and Television Work. McFarland, 2003.

External links

1894 births
1968 deaths
British male stage actors
British male film actors
Male actors from London
20th-century British male actors
English cricketers
Surrey cricketers
Marylebone Cricket Club cricketers
Gentlemen of the South cricketers
H. D. G. Leveson Gower's XI cricketers